Nicholas Theodore is an American neurosurgeon and researcher at Johns Hopkins University School of Medicine.  He is known for his work in spinal trauma, minimally invasive surgery, robotics, and personalized medicine.  He is Director of the Neurosurgical Spine Program at Johns Hopkins and Co-Director of the Carnegie Center for Surgical Innovation at Johns Hopkins.

Dr. Theodore graduated from Cornell University, where he was the recipient of a Cornell Tradition Academic Fellowship. He attended medical school at Georgetown University, where he graduated with honors. After completing his internship at Bethesda Naval Hospital, Dr. Theodore served as a Senior General Medical Officer with the United States Marine Corps in Okinawa, Japan.

Dr. Theodore completed his neurosurgical residency and a fellowship in spinal surgery at the Barrow Neurological Institute. After completing his residency in 2001, he served as Chief of the Division of Neurosurgery at Naval Medical Center San Diego, overseeing the largest neurosurgery complement in the Navy.

In 2003, Dr. Theodore joined the faculty at the Barrow Neurological Institute, and assumed the position of Director of Neurotrauma.  In 2004 he was appointed Associate Director of the Neurosurgery Residency Program at Barrow.  The Neurosurgery Residency Program at Barrow is the largest in the United States, training four residents per academic year, for a total of 28 residents.  In 2009 he became the Chief of the Spine Section at the Barrow Neurological Institute and was appointed the Volker K.H. Sonntag Chair in 2015.  In 2016 he became the second Donlin M. Long Professor of Neurosurgery at Johns Hopkins Hospital.  Dr. Theodore also holds professorships in Orthopedics and Biomedical Engineering at Johns Hopkins.  He is also actively involved in the area of preventative medicine within neurosurgery. He has been associated with the ThinkFirst Foundation for several years, having served as the foundation’s Medical Director and President. In 2017, Dr. Theodore was appointed to the National Football League’s Head, Neck and Spine Committee, of which he became Chairman in 2018.  In 2020, Michael J. Fox revealed in his memoir that Dr. Theodore performed a risky but successful surgery on him to remove an ependymoma in Fox’s spinal cord.

Research 

Dr. Theodore's main research focus is on complex spinal disorders, spinal cord injury, and advanced surgical technologies. He has published over 300 peer-reviewed articles and book chapters, and has given more than 300 technical presentations. He is the recipient of several awards, including the Mayfield Award and the Tasker Award from the Congress of Neurological Surgeons, as well as being named in "US News Top Docs". He was one of the senior investigators in a multi-center study that tested a new medication for patients with spinal cord injury.  Dr. Theodore has received an NIH RO-1 grant to study novel approaches to spinal surgery, as well as the development of customized devices for patients with spinal cord injury. Less than 10% of these grants are funded nationally.

In 2014, Dr. Theodore was the recipient of a United States Department of Defense grant to conduct a multi-center study evaluating the drainage of cerebrospinal fluid to treat of acute spinal cord injury. In 2010, Dr. Theodore founded Excelsius Surgical along with Neil Crawford and Mitch Foster, focusing on the development of a mobile real-time image-guided robot for spinal, brain, and biopsy applications. He sold Excelsius Surgical to Globus Medical four years later. In August 2017, the Globus Medical ExcelsiusGPS robot received 510k clearance by the FDA and Dr. Theodore performed the first case in the world on October 4, 2017.

In 2020, Dr. Theodore, and his team, received a grant in the amount of $13.48 million from the Defense Advanced Research Projects Agency’s (DARPA) Bridging the Gap+ program to fund research in new approaches to treatment of spinal cord injury. With this grant, Dr. Theodore, and his team, including biomedical engineer, Dr. Amir Manbachi, are pioneering futuristic efforts to treat patients with spinal cord injury by integrating novel imaging and therapeutic ultrasound and electrical modalities. As part of this program, Dr. Theodore, and Dr. Manbachi work alongside a world-class team of experts, including teams at Johns Hopkins Engineering, Applied Physics Laboratory, Columbia University, and Sonic Concepts.

In 2020, Dr. Theodore published the largest series of patients who had undergone vertebral column shortening for tethered spinal cord syndrome. This article, which has the longest follow-up of other published series, established this procedure as a viable alternative to standard interventions. In 2023, the team received the FDA's 'Breakthrough Device Designation' for implantable ultrasound sensors for patients with spinal cord injury.

Dr. Theodore joined the medical advisory board for Harvard MedTech, which specializes in developing new treatments that combine Virtual reality, behavioral health coaching and Artificial intelligence algorithms to retrain neural pathways within the brain.

Recent publications 
 
 
 
 
 Kalani MY, Filippidis A, Martirosyan NL, Theodore N. "Cerebral Herniation as a Complication of Chest Tube Drainage of Cerebrospinal Fluid After Injury to the Spine.  World Neurosurg. 2011;
 Kalb S, Martirosyan NL, Kalani MY, Broc GG, Theodore N.  "Genetics of the Degenerated Intervertebral Disc. World Neurosurg. 2011;

References

External links 
Johns Hopkins University Neurology & Neurosurgery
Nicholas Theodore, MD | Johns Hopkins Profile
Publications | PubMed

American neurosurgeons
People from Phoenix, Arizona
Cornell University alumni
Georgetown University School of Medicine alumni
United States Marine Corps officers
Living people
Year of birth missing (living people)